Truter is a surname. Notable people with the surname include:

Anna Maria Truter (1777–1857), Cape Colony illustrator
Johannes Andreas Truter (1763–1845), Cape Colony judge
Oloff Johannes Truter (1829–1881), South African civil servant
Petrus Johannes Truter (1747–1825), Cape Colony explorer and official